Caroline Ducey (born Caroline Trousselard, 12 December 1976) is a French actress who has appeared in 34 films since 1994. Outside of her home country, she is best known for her controversial role in Catherine Breillat's 1999 film Romance, a role for which she was awarded the 2000 Étoile d’or de la révélation féminine (Gold Star) by l’Académie de la presse du cinéma français. Ducey was nominated for the Prix Michel Simon film prize for Best Actress in Familles je vous hais (1997). In 2000, she was a member of the jury at the 22nd Moscow International Film Festival.

Filmography
 Trop de bonheur (1994) a.k.a. Too Much Happiness
 Noël! Noël! (1995)
 Familles je vous hais (1997)
 Romance (1999)
 Innocent (1999)
 Le Trèfle à quatre feuilles (2000)
 Porte-bonheur (2000)
 La Chambre obscure (2000)
 Entre deux rails (2001)
 Carrément à l'Ouest (2001)
 La Cage (2002) a.k.a. The Cage
 Prendimi l'anima (2002) a.k.a. The Soul Keeper
 Shimkent hôtel (2003)
 Ballo a tre passi (2003) a.k.a. Three-Step Dance
 Amateur (2004)
 Croisière (2004)
 Handicap (2004)
 Doo Wop (2004)
 Les Étrangers (2004)
 Naissance de l'orgueil (2005)
 J'ai besoin d'air (2005)
 Convivium (2005)
 J'ai rêvé sous l'eau (2005) a.k.a. I Dreamt Under Water
 La Californie (2006)
 Une vieille maîtresse (2007) a.k.a. The Last Mistress
 J'ai rêvé sous l'eau (2008) a.k.a. I Dreamt Under the Water
 Le Plaisir de chanter (2008)
 Just Ines (2010)
 Open my eyes, close my eyes (2012)
 Bangkok Renaissance (2012)
 Le Dernier Clan (2012)
 Hôtel du paradis (2012)
 Simple Passion (2020)

Television
 Tous les garçons et les filles de leur âge... episode – Bonheur (1994)
 L'Inventaire (1998)
 L'Amour prisonnier (2000)
 Petit Ben (2000)
 Reporters (2007)
 Les Bleus: premiers pas dans la police episode – Faux semblants (2007)

Awards
Shooting Stars Award (2000)

References

External links
 
 
 

French film actresses
1977 births
Living people
20th-century French actresses
21st-century French actresses
People from Sainte-Adresse